The highland garter snake (Thamnophis fulvus) is a species of snake of the family Colubridae. It is found in Mexico, Guatemala, Honduras and El Salvador.

References 

Thamnophis
Reptiles described in 1893
Taxa named by Marie Firmin Bocourt
Reptiles of Mexico
Reptiles of Guatemala
Reptiles of Honduras
Reptiles of El Salvador
Taxobox binomials not recognized by IUCN